Olympiacos women's volleyball team, commonly referred to as Olympiacos, Olympiacos Piraeus or with its full name as Olympiacos CFP,  is the women's volleyball department of the major Greek multi-sport club, Olympiacos CFP, based in Piraeus, Attica. The department was founded in 1930 and their home ground is the Melina Mercouri Indoor Hall in Agios Ioannis Rentis, Piraeus.

Olympiacos is one of the most successful volleyball clubs in Greece and the country's most successful in European competitions, having won 8 League titles, a record 9 Cups, a record 7 Doubles, a CEV Challenge Cup (2018) and a Continental Treble (2018), the only women's volleyball club in Greece to have won a European title. They hold the unique records for winning eight consecutive Greek League titles (2013–2020), nine consecutive national Cups (2011–2019) and seven consecutive Doubles (2013–2019).

The season 2017–18 was the most successful in the club's history and the most successful by any Greek women's volleyball club in history; besides winning the aforementioned CEV Challenge Cup in their second final presence in a row, they won the domestic competitions undefeated, with 25–0 wins in the League, finishing the season with only two sets lost in an unprecedented 75–2 set record, and 4–0 wins in the Cup with a 12–1 set record, achieving a Continental Treble and their sixth consecutive domestic Double. In the same season, the men's volleyball team reached the CEV Challenge Cup final and Olympiacos became the first Greek volleyball club that had men and women playing simultaneously in European finals, and one of the very few in the continent to have won European trophies in both departments.

Honours

Domestic competitions
 Hellenic Championship
 Winners (8): 2012–13, 2013–14, 2014–15, 2015–16, 2016–17, 2017–18, 2018–19, 2019–20
 Hellenic Cup
 Winners (9) (record): 2010–11, 2011–12, 2012–13, 2013–14, 2014–15, 2015–16, 2016–17, 2017–18, 2018–19,
 Double
 Winners (7) (record): 2012–13, 2013–14, 2014–15, 2015–16, 2016–17, 2017–18, 2018–19

European competitions
 CEV Women's Challenge Cup
 Winners (1): 2017–18
 Runners-up (1): 2016–17
 Treble
 Winners (1): 2017–18

International record

The road to the 2017–18 CEV Challenge Cup victory

Season 2022–2023 squad

Notes 
1: Until February
2: Until December
3: Since January
4: Until January
5: Since February
6: Since December

Technical and managerial staff

Notable players

(Players are listed in alphabetical order)

Eva Chantava
Evangelia Chatziefraimoglou
Maria Chatzinikolaou
Stella Christodoulou
Athina Dilaveri
Alexandra Diplarou
Vaia Dirva
Melina Emmanouilidou
Dimitra Giakoumi
Katerina Giota
Marina Kalaitzieva
Alexia Kalantaridou
Areti Karavasili
Anna Kavatha
Eleni Kiosi
Pola Kitsou
Eirini Kokkinaki
Areta Konomi
Aliki Konstantinidou
Sofia Kosma
Eleftheria Koukou
Evi Kyriakidou
Tzina Lamprousi
Maria Maggina
Niki Manolakou
Chrysoula Neratzi
Katerina Nikolaidou
Vaso Nikouli
Maria Nomikou
Chara Papadopoulou
Maria Plagiannakou
Areti Teza
Athanasia Totsidou
Zenia Tsima
Katerina Vasilaki
Gianna Vlachou
Anna Xerikou
Nikol Zaharea

Nadzeya Malasai

Mariana Costa

Aneta Germanova
Elena Koleva
Radosveta Teneva
Gabriela Tsvetanova
Antonina Zetova

Biljana Gligorović
Karla Klarić

Wilma Salas

Manolina Konstantinou
Katerina Zakchaiou

Michaela Monzoni
Lucie Mühlsteinová
Jana Simankova

Riikka Lehtonen

Laura Emonts
Saskia Hippe
Jana Franziska Poll

Katalin Kiss

Tatiana Artmenko

Manuela Secolo

Julia Borisova

Yuliya Saltsevich

Aleksandra Crnčević
Svetlana Krstić
Ana Lazarević
Ivana Luković
Ivana Nešović
Maja Ognjenović
Biljana Simanić
Jovana Vesović

Ivana Bramborová
Martina Noseková

Sonja Borovinšek

Eleni Gkortsaniouk
Olga Trach

Mallori Gibson
Stephanie Niemer
Regan Hood Scott
Taylor Agost

Notable coaches

See also
 Olympiacos Men's Volleyball Team

References

External links

 Official website 
 Olympiacos Women's Volleyball team on CEV official website 
 Olympiacos profile on women.volleybox.net 

Volleyball
Greek volleyball clubs